Gharo ( ) is a Town located in Thatta District, Sindh, Pakistan. Its population is about 2.000 families in 2017.

It has large bazar for shopping of local communities, sits on the delta of the Indus River, its economy is based on fishing and agriculture.
The Smart School,a project of The City School, Gharo Dhabeji Campus is situated in New Dhabeji.

The Gharo Wind Power Plant is being built near Gharo.

See also
 Marho Kotri Wildlife Sanctuary

External links 
  Life in Gharo
  Fishery in Gharo

References 

Populated places in Thatta District